Intown Atlanta (or as an adjective, "intown") is a loosely-defined term used by the residents of Atlanta, Georgia, in the United States. It is most frequently used in metro Atlanta to designate an area containing parts of the City of Atlanta and bordering communities. The definition of "intown" varies significantly:

Strictest definition
According to "Intown Elite Real Estate Services" the strictest definition of "intown" includes only Downtown and Midtown Atlanta and the surrounding, mostly pre-World War II neighborhoods that contain unique destinations that draw customers from across metro Atlanta.
 Examples of such neighborhoods include:
 Grant Park with the Zoo Atlanta
 Virginia-Highland and Edgewood with their concentrations of shops and restaurants, or
 Midtown West, Cabbagetown and Reynoldstown with their industrial architectural heritage, hip coffee shops and galleries
 However, Buckhead is excluded from this definition of "intown", considered a separate area due to its size and physical distance from Downtown Atlanta
 Decatur is included in this definition
 West End was referred to as an Intown Neighborhood as early as 1982.
 Central neighborhoods such as Pittsburgh and Mechanicsville which do not have attractions, or shops and restaurants that attract significant numbers of outsiders are usually not included
 Sources using this definition include Where Magazine, Intown Elite. and Intown Drew.
 A Google Maps search for businesses that include the word "Intown" returns results that conform closely to this definition.

Including Buckhead
Similar to the above definition, but including Buckhead. Sources using this definition include Intown Atlanta Guide & Maps, INtown Atlanta and Atlanta Intown Real Estate Services.

Everything inside the perimeter
Finally, Intown may refer to all of Atlanta and surrounding areas of Fulton, DeKalb, and Cobb counties inside I-285 ("the Perimeter"). This definition includes, for example, the airport, cities like East Point and Hapeville, unincorporated communities in DeKalb county like North Atlanta and North Druid Hills, and all of Southwest and Southeast Atlanta. It covers the same territory as the term "ITP" ("inside the Perimeter").

References

Atlanta metropolitan area